"Jumping (Out the Window)" is a song by American hip hop producer Ron Browz. It was released on November 25, 2008 and produced by Ron Browz himself. The song is the second official single off his debut album Etherboy. The song is featured in the video game Grand Theft Auto IV: The Lost and Damned & Grand Theft Auto: The Ballad of Gay Tony.

Music video
The music video was released on January 27, 2009. It was directed by Mike Hand & Mary Evelyn McGough for Bait Entertainment. It features him in front of a green screen. The video ranked at #62 on BET's Notarized: Top 100 Videos of 2009 countdown.

Remix
The official remix, entitled "Jumping (Out the Window) (The Remix) [Guitar Down Version]", is a rock remix that features pop rock band Forever The Sickest Kids. It was released February 10, 2009.

Music video
The music video for the remix was directed by Mike Hand & Mary Evelyn McGough, the same directors who directed the music video for the original version. The music video was released the same day as the song, February 10, 2009. The background and Ron's outfit that was used during halfway of the original video was shown in the video for the remix.

Charts

References

2008 singles
2008 songs
Ron Browz songs
Universal Motown Records singles
Song recordings produced by Ron Browz
Songs written by Ron Browz